Marinette is a loa of power and violence in Haitian Vodou. In her petro form, she is called Marinette Bras Cheche (Marinette of the Dry Arms) or Marinette Pied Cheche (Marinette of the Dry Feet), suggesting that she is skeletal.  

She is believed to be the mambo who sacrificed the black pig at the culmination of the start of the first Haitian Revolution. While she is feared and tends to ride those she possesses violently, she can also be seen as one who frees her people from bondage.

Marinette is represented by a screech owl and is often seen as the protector of werewolves. Her Catholic counterpart is the Anima Sola (Forsaken Soul) who can either free one from bondage or drag you back. Her colors are black and deep blood red. Her offerings are black pigs and black roosters plucked alive.

Marinette is not cruel. She only gets cruel in possession, when people burn animals or humans. She likes salvia, black pepper, lavender, and sweets.

In popular culture
Marinette is a main character in Rem Oscuro's book I am the Dark.
FLÏRT, a band from Hamburg, Germany, refers to Marinette in the song "Marinette of the Dry Feet".
Marinette is the main antagonist in the DC Comics Series Ragman - Cry of the Dead.
Marinette appears in the DC/Vertigo Comics series House of Whispers which takes place in the Sandman universe. 
Marinette, or Her Lady of the Dry Arms, appears in "The Bruja" by Michael Molisani.
Marinette is one of the districts on asteroid Legba in Eclipse Phase RPG setting.

References

Haitian Vodou goddesses